Cedric Omoigui (born 11 November 1994), simply known as Cedric, is a Nigerian footballer who plays as a forward for Spanish club Racing de Santander.

Football career
Born in Benin City, Cedric moved to Spain in 1996, aged only two. He joined RCD Mallorca's youth setup in 2008, and made his senior debuts with the reserves in the 2013–14 campaign, scoring 28 goals in Tercera División.

On 14 December 2014 Cedric made his professional debut, replacing fellow youth graduate Abdón Prats in a 1–1 home draw against CD Numancia in the Segunda División championship. On 27 August of the following year he was loaned to another reserve team, Valencia CF Mestalla.

On 6 August 2018, free agent Cedric signed a one-year deal with CF Fuenlabrada in Segunda División B. One year later, he joined Belgian club Royal Excel Mouscron on a three-year contract.

Cedric returned to Spain and its third division on 2 October 2020, after agreeing to a two-year deal with Racing de Santander.

References

External links
Mallorca official profile 

1995 births
Living people
Sportspeople from Benin City
Nigerian footballers
Association football forwards
Segunda División players
Segunda División B players
Tercera División players
RCD Mallorca B players
RCD Mallorca players
Valencia CF Mestalla footballers
CF Fuenlabrada footballers
Racing de Santander players
Belgian Pro League players
Royal Excel Mouscron players
Nigerian expatriate footballers
Nigerian expatriate sportspeople in Spain
Nigerian expatriate sportspeople in Belgium
Expatriate footballers in Spain
Expatriate footballers in Belgium